Benny Jack Bowman (July 4, 1932 – August 1, 2022) was an American politician from the state of Tennessee who served in the Tennessee House of Representatives from 1967 to 1976. A Republican, he represented Roane County, Tennessee. Residing in Harriman, Tennessee, he was a businessman and farmer. Bowman was of the Southern Baptist faith and was a life-long member of Caney Ford Baptist Church. He died on August 1, 2022, at the age of 90.

References

1932 births
2022 deaths
Members of the Tennessee House of Representatives
People from Kingston, Tennessee
People from Harriman, Tennessee
Tennessee Technological University alumni
Businesspeople from Tennessee
Farmers from Tennessee